A square drive may refer to:

 External square drive
 Internal square drive, also known as a Robertson drive
 a batting shot in cricket